According to the United States Energy Information Administration (EIA), Pakistan may have over  of petroleum oil and  in natural gas (including shale gas) reserves.

As per BP' Sitatistical Review of World Energy 2016, at the end of 2015 Pakistan had the following proved reserves of fuels: 0.5 Trillion cu m of natural gas and 2.07 Billion tons of coal (sub-bituminous and lignite).

Oil industry

Discovery 
Pakistan's first gas field was found in late 1952 in Balochistan near the giant Sui gas field. The Toot oilfield was not discovered until the early 1960s in the Punjab. Pakistan Petroleum and Pakistan Oilfields explored and began drilling these fields with Soviet help in 1961 and activity began in the Toot oilfield during 1964.

History 

The Toot area is one of the oldest oil producing regions in Pakistan with the first oilwell drilled in 1964 when President Ayub Khan encouraged a mineral development policy. It is located in the Khaur, Punjab Province, which is located approximately 135 km southwest of the capital city of Islamabad. In 1964 the first well was drilled and commercial production started in 1967. There are about 60 million barrels of oil in place of which 12%-15% is recoverable. At its peak during 1986, the field was producing approximately 2,400 barrel of oil per day.lar
It has grown steadily since then, producing both oil and, to a lesser degree, natural gas. Oil production was entirely confined to the Potwar Plateau till 1981, when Union Texas Pakistan subsidiary discovered its first oil-field in Lower Sindh. By 1998-1999, the Lower Sindh gas-fields were producing more oil than the Potohar Plateau. Since then, new deposits have also been found here.

Modern exploration 

In 2005, the Vancouver-based 'International Sovereign Energy' signed a memorandum of understanding with the Oil and Gas Development Company Limited, Pakistan's national oil company, to develop the Toot field. Schlumberger Oilfield Services first started operations in early 2006. After favorable results, the Vancouver based 'Junior oil' and International 'Sovereign Energy Corp'. Oil and gas exploration companies signed a memorandum of agreement with the Oil and Gas Development Company Limited, Pakistan's national oil company, in mid-2005, to develop the Toot field in Punjab Province, near the capital city of Islamabad. The company is also providing electricity to locals living around the residential camps of Toot oil field and the neighbouring Missa Keswaal oil field.

Petroleum refining 
The crude oil that is produced in Pakistan gets refined at home at five oil refineries which are Cnergyico Pk Limited, Pak-Arab Refinery Company Limited (PARCO), Pakistan Refinery Limited, Attock Refinery Limited, and National Refinery Limited. The combined processing capacity of these five refineries is roughly 420,000 barrels per day. Cnergyico Pk Limited is Pakistan's largest oil refiner with intalled processing capacity of 156,000 barrels per day, accounting for around 37% of Pakistan's total oil refining capacity.

Natural gas industry 

Natural gas production is at a relatively high level and remaining reserves are estimated to be  about 885.3 billion cu m (1 January 2009 est.). Pakistan's gas fields are only expected to last for about another 20 years at the most due to heavy industrial usage.

The Largest Gas Producing province of Pakistan is Sindh.

The Sui gas field is the biggest natural gas field in Pakistan. It is located near Sui in Balochistan. The gas field was discovered in the late 1952 and the commercial exploitation of the field began in 1955. Sui gas field accounts for 6% of Pakistan's gas production. The operator of the field is Pakistan Petroleum Limited.

Coal industry

History 

Coal was first discovered across Pakistan and the rest of South Asia in the 1880s and was used by the British-owned railway companies under colonial rule. Later, post-colonial Pakistan had used coal to fuel its industry from independence to the discovery of the Baluchistan's Sui gas field in 1952 and the Toot oilfield in 1964.

Environmentalists are now concerned that Pakistan has recently discovered one low and four low to medium quality coal seams in the Punjab and plans to re-fuel its economically important cement industry with it after their oil fields have run dry. Low sulfur coal was recently reported to have been found at the Baluchistan near Quetta as well. There are reports that low a sulfur deposit has been found near Islamabad.

Sindh's Thar desert lignite mines will also be expanded soon for industrial usage too. This Thar's mine is open-cut mine. These mines are relatively safer to mine from. While Baluchistan's mines are underground mines, these are dangerous to mine from.

Pakistan Baluchistan's mines have seen several accidents over the years among which the one which happened in 2011 was with the greatest number of casualties. According to one news paper the death toll rose up to 45, though majority agree upon that it ranged from 40-45 people.

Special measures are being employed to reduce the resulting fly ash, carbon footprint and sulphur fume emission problems after it is burnt.

Types of coal found 

Bituminous coal is a relatively hard and less sulfurous coal containing a tar-like substance called bitumen and would be burnt largely on domestic fires after being turned into coke fuel.

Sub-bituminous coal is a coal whose properties range from those of lignite to those of bituminous coal and is used primarily as fuel for steam-electric power generation. It is set to fuel power stations and cement works in Pakistan.

Lignite is a low-grade, sulfurous coal that is generally used in modified industrial furnaces to generate heat for boilers, coke oven heaters, brick kilns, etc. However it can be converted to a substitute for crude oil through the Fischer Tropsch technology. There are discussions on setting up a plant with Shenhua Ningxia Coal of China.

Workings 

Musakhel Balochistan
(Kingri-Aram-Safa Coal fields)
Location- 175 km from Multan and 290 km from Quetta
Types of Coal- Sub-bituminous to Bituminous and Lignite
Total Coal Reserves- 17.5 Millions
Production- 56,009 Tons

Lakhara
Location-176 km north of Karachi, 65 km northwest of Hyderabad
Type of Coal-Sub-bituminous to lignite
Total coal resources- 38.82 million tons
Production- (2003–04) 217,967 tons

Dengari
Location- 35 km south-east of Quetta
Type of Coal- Sub-bituminous-A to high volatile B-bituminous
Total coal resources- 15.42 million tonnes
Production- (2003–04)  15,043 tons

Sor-range
Location  - 16 km east of Quetta
Type of Coal- Sub-bituminous-A to high volatile B-bituminous
Total coal resources- 12.95 million tonnes
Production- (2003–04) 56,132 tons

Nowshera (Shaidu, Khawrai, Pethawo area)
oil and gas resources available
Shahrig
Coal field location-  160 km north-east of Quetta
Type of Coal- Sub Bituminous B to heavy volatile Bituminous-A
Total coal resources-  28.97 million tonnes
Production- (2003–04)  94,583 tons

Sonda
Coal field location- Near to Quetta
Type of Coal- Sub Bituminous B to heavy volatile Bituminous-A
Total coal resources-  N/A.
Production- (2003–04)  N/A.

Lignite industry

Production
Sindh's Thar desert and lignite mines in Kingri Balochistan will also be expanded soon for industrial usage. Special measures are being employed to reduce the resulting fly ash, carbon footprint and sulphur fume emission problems after it is burnt. However it can be converted to a substitute for crude oil through the Fischer Tropsch technology. There are discussions on setting up a plant with Shenhua Group of China.

The Lignite/ Brown Coal of Kingri Coal fields in percentage from 44 - 79 % use in formation of Humic Acid. Usage is in high quantity. Lignite can also be a source of fertilizer and soil conditioner.

Usage 
Lignite is a low grade, sulphurous coal that is generally used in modified industrial furnaces to generate heat for boilers, coke oven heaters, brick kilns, etc. However it can be converted to a substitute for crude oil through the Fischer Tropsch technology. There are discussions on setting up a plant with Shenhua Group of China.

Nowadays Lignite use in humic Acid formation from last three years especially of Kingri Area of Balochistan

Uranium production

History 
Pakistan has had a long history of exporting small amounts of uranium to the West. The Tumman Leghari mine in South Punjab, Baghalchur mine, Dera Ghazi Khan mine and Issa Khel / Kubul Kel mines in Mianwali District. Pakistan has recently used some in its own nuclear power and weapons programs.

Mines 

The Wahi Pandi, Karunuk (Sehwan), and Rehman Dhora (Aamri) mines in the, Kirthar Range, Sindh and the Shanawah Deposit, Karak in Khyber Pakhtunkhwa province are being opened up to meet Pakistan's rising need for uranium, which these sources are  issuing at an ore grade: 0.04% Uranium mineral purity  rate. The Baghalchur  site has several  abandoned mines and is now being used as an industrial dumping ground. 

Baghalchur  is a small town in Dera Ghazi Khan District, Punjab, Pakistan. Baghalchur is the site of abandoned Uranium mines now being used as a nuclear dump. The residents of the area along with several Pakistani environmentalist groups are opposed to the nuclear dump being used by Pakistan Atomic Energy Commission (PAEC), and have asked the government to invest in better techniques in the disposal of nuclear waste materials.

Output 
Pakistan produced about  45 tonnes of uranium in 2006.

See also
 Cnergyico Pk Limited
 Attock Group of Companies
 Oil industry
 Iran–Pakistan–India gas pipeline

References

External links 
 Map of the oil and gas infrastructure in Pakistan

Fossil fuels in Pakistan
Oil fields of Pakistan
Oil and gas companies of Pakistan
Pakistan